Walter Sorkale (17 January 1890 – 18 March 1946) was a German footballer who played as a midfielder and made one appearance for the Germany national team.

Career
Sorkale earned his first and only cap for Germany on 29 October 1911 in a friendly against Sweden. The home match, which took place in Hamburg, finished as a 1–3 loss for Germany.

Personal life
Sorkale died on 18 March 1946 at the age of 56.

Career statistics

International

References

External links
 
 
 
 

1890 births
1946 deaths
Footballers from Berlin
German footballers
Germany international footballers
Association football midfielders
BFC Preussen players